Sphenomorphus rufus  is a species of skink found in Indonesia.

References

rufus
Reptiles described in 1887
Taxa named by George Albert Boulenger